Oreocnide is a genus of flowering plants belonging to the family Urticaceae.

Its native range is Tropical and Subtropical Asia.

Species
Species:

Oreocnide boniana 
Oreocnide frutescens 
Oreocnide integrifolia 
Oreocnide × intermedia 
Oreocnide kwangsiensis 
Oreocnide murina 
Oreocnide nivea 
Oreocnide obovata 
Oreocnide pedunculata 
Oreocnide rhodopleura 
Oreocnide rubescens 
Oreocnide rufescens 
Oreocnide semicrenata 
Oreocnide serrulata 
Oreocnide tonkinensis 
Oreocnide trinervis

References

Urticaceae
Urticaceae genera